Willi Moy (born 27 September 1958) is a French gymnast. He competed at the 1976 Summer Olympics and the 1980 Summer Olympics.

References

1958 births
Living people
French male artistic gymnasts
Olympic gymnasts of France
Gymnasts at the 1976 Summer Olympics
Gymnasts at the 1980 Summer Olympics
Place of birth missing (living people)
20th-century French people